In information technology, a notification system is a combination of software and hardware that provides a means of delivering a message to a set of recipients. It commonly shows activity related to an account. Such systems constitute an important aspect of modern Web applications.

For example, a notification system can send an e-mail announcing when a computer network will be down for a scheduled maintenance.

The complexity of the notification system may vary. Complicated notification systems are used by businesses to reach  critical employees. Emergency notification systems may take advantage of modern information technologies. Governments use them to inform people of upcoming danger.

In mobile phones and smartphones, dedicated hardware such as a notification LED is sometimes included to deliver messages or notify users.

See also
 Emergency notification system
 Emergency communication system
 Emergency broadcast system
 Emergency alert system
Emergency telephone number
 ePrompter, an e-mail notification system

References

Human–computer interaction
Information systems